Statista is an online platform specialized in market and consumer data, which offers statistics and reports, market insights, consumer insights and company insights in German, English, Spanish and French. In addition to publicly available third-party data, Statista also provides numerous exclusive data via the platform. According to its own information, the platform offers more than 1,000,000 statistics on over 80,000 topics from more than 22,500 sources in over 150 countries and is accessed 31 million times a month (as of December 2022). The company claims to cover around 170 industries with its content. In 2022, Statista had more than 2 million registered users, with which the company generates around 140 million euros in revenue.  Statista has been owned by Ströer Media since 2015, with an 81.3% stake.

The company provides statistics and survey results, which are presented in charts and tables. Its main target groups are business customers, lecturers and researchers. The data provided by the company covers, among other things, advertisement, buying behavior or specific industries.

Statistics and survey results are offered and presented in charts, infographics as well as tables. In addition, the company offers a variety of reports and outlooks. The target groups are primarily business customers, teachers and researchers. Topics include advertising, purchasing behavior, politics and society, technology, and data on individual sectors of the economy and countries.  

In 2020, Statista announced plans to offer subscriptions to a database of companies, thus entering into competition with Bloomberg L.P. According to its own information, the portal's data partners include the Federal Statistical Office, the Allensbach Institute for Public Opinion Research, the OECD and the German Institute for Economic Research. Other partners include the Financial Times and Fortune.

Awards
The web site deutsche-startups.de named Statista "Start-up of the Year" in 2008 and in the same year, the company was among the winners of the start-up competition "Enable to Start", sponsored by the Financial Times Germany. In 2010, the initiative "Deutschland – Land der Ideen" (Germany – Land of Ideas) selected Statista as one of the winners in the category "Landmarks in the Land of Ideas 2010" and awarded the European Red Herring Prize. In 2012, Statista was nominated for the German Entrepreneur Award in the category "Fast Climber", and in 2020, it was included in a list of  Must-Have Databases for Academic and Public Libraries by Library Journal.

References

External links 
 Homepage of Statista 

Online companies of Germany
Companies based in Hamburg